Central Aceh Regency is a regency in Aceh Special Region (Nanggroe Aceh Darussalam) of Indonesia. It is located on Sumatra island.  Formerly this regency covered a much larger area; in 1969, the Southeast Aceh Regency was separated from the Central Aceh Regency, and in 2003 the Bener Meriah Regency was separated from the remaining Central Aceh Regency. The remaining regency covers an area of 4,454.04 square kilometres and had a population of 175,527 according to the 2010 census, which rose to 215,576 at the 2020 Census; the official estimate as at mid 2021 was 218,684. Most of its inhabitants are Gayo. Central Aceh is famous for its Lake Laut Tawar. Its capital is Takengon, in Lut Tawar District.

The residual regency is the main centre of coffee production within Aceh province and is home to the Gayo people who are mostly concentrated in this regency and in the neighbouring Bener Meriah Regency and Gayo Lues Regency.

Geography 
The regency borders Pidie Regency, Bireuen Regency and Bener Meriah Regency to the north, East Aceh Regency to the east, Gayo Lues Regency to the south and West Aceh, Pidie, and Nagan Raya regencies to the west.

Central Aceh District is a highland with an altitude between 200 – 2600 meters above sea level with an area of 4,454.50 km2.

Administrative districts 
The regency is divided administratively into fourteen districts (kecamatan), tabulated below with their areas and their populations at the 2010 Census and the 2020 Census, together with the official estimates as at mid 2021. The table also includes the locations of the district administrative centres and the number of villages (rural desa and urban kelurahan) in each district.

Politics 

Its current regent is Drs. Shabela Abubakar, while his vice regent is H. Firdaus SKM. They have held the positions since 28 December 2017.

The Parliament Members are:

 Ir. Syukur Kobath Golkar
 Saib Nosarios PKP Indonesia
 H. Zulpikar, AB, SE PNBK
 Kasmawi, SH, SE Golkar
 Drs. Samar Nawan Golkar
 Sabirin Golkar
 Mohd. Noh Golkar
 Yahman Demokrat
 Alamsyah Demokrat
 Hamzah Abd. Gani Demokrat
 Subahrin Demokrat
 M. Alasyah Yakub Persatuan Pembangunan
 Drs. Abdussalam Persatuan Pembangunan
 Banta Mude, SP Persatuan Pembangunan
 Drs. Yurmiza Putra Patriot Pancasila
 Ir. Amiruddin Patriot pancasila
 Adraka Ahfa PKP Indonesia
 H.M. Yusbi Hakim Kebangsaan Demokrasi
 H. Marsito, MR Kebangsaan Demokrasi
 Wajadal Muna, SH Amanat Nasional
 Nurdin Bintang Reformasi
 Bardan Sahidi, S.Pdi Keadilan Sejahtera
 Ir. Ampera Karya Peduli Bangsa
 Drs. H. Mustafa Ali Bulan Bintang
 Halidin Sarikat Indonesia

Tourism 
There are several tourist attractions, such as Danau Laut Tawar, Pantan Terong (scenery attraction), Gunung Burni Telong (hot spring), Taman Buru Linge Isak (hunting), Gua Loyang Koro, Loyang Pukes, Loyang Datu, Burni Klieten (hiking), and Krueng Peusangan (rafting).

References 

Regencies of Aceh